MLY may refer to:

Manley Hot Springs Airport, Alaska, IATA and FAA LID airport code
Morley railway station, West Yorkshire, National Rail station code